Damansara Utama was a state constituency in Selangor, Malaysia, that had been represented in the Selangor State Legislative Assembly since 1986 until 2018.

The state constituency was created in the 1984 redistribution and was mandated to return a single member to the Selangor State Legislative Assembly under the first past the post voting system.

In the 2018 redelination exercise, this constituency was redistributed to Bandar Utama

History 
It was abolished in 2018 when it was redistributed

Representation history

Election results

References 

Defunct Selangor state constituencies